This article lists characters in the various canonical incarnations of Star Trek. This includes fictional main and major characters created for the franchise.

Key

Main and recurring characters 
{| class="wikitable sortable mw-collapsible" style="text-align:left" 
|-
! Character
! Actor(s)
! Appearances
! Rank
! Posting
! Position
! Species
|-
| rowspan="2" | Airiam
| Sara Mitich
| rowspan="2" | Seasons 1–2 (DSC)
| rowspan="2" | Lt. Commander
| rowspan="2" |  USS Discovery
| rowspan="2" | Science Officer
| rowspan="2" | Human cyborg
|-
| Hannah Cheesman
|-
| Jonathan Archer
| Scott Bakula
| Seasons 1–4 (ENT)
| Captain
| Enterprise NX-01
| Commanding Officer
| Human
|-
| Soji Asha
| Isa Briones
| Seasons 1-2 (PIC)
| Civilian
| Romulan Reclamation Site
| Anthropologist
| Android
|-
| Ayala
| Tarik Ergin
| Seasons 1–7 (VOY)
| Lieutenant, JG (provisional)
| USS Voyager
| Helmsman (S7) Security Officer (S1-7) Maquis (previous)
| Human
|-
| Azan
| Kurt Wetherill
| Seasons 6–7 (VOY)
| Civilian
| USS Voyager Passenger
|
| Wysanti/xB
|-
| Reginald Barclay
| Dwight Schultz 
| Seasons 3–4,6–7 (TNG) Movies (FCT) Seasons 2,6–7 (VOY)
| Lt. Commander (VOY) Lieutenant, JG (TNG, FCT)
| Starfleet Command (VOY) USS Enterprise-E (FCT) USS Enterprise-D (TNG)
| Pathfinder Project (VOY) Engineering Officer (TNG,Movies)
| Human
|-
| Bareil Antos
| Philip Anglim
| Seasons 1–3,6 (DS9)
| Vedek
| Bajor resident
| Bajoran Religious Leader (S1-3)
| Bajoran
|-
| Julian Bashir
| Alexander Siddig
| Seasons 1–7 (DS9) Season 6 (TNG)
| Lieutenant (S4-7) Lieutenant, JG (S1-3)
| Deep Space 9
| Chief Medical Officer
| Human
|-
| B'Etor
| Gwynyth Walsh
| Seasons 4–5,7 (TNG) Movies (GEN)  Season 1 (DS9)
| Commander, Klingon Empire
| Bird of Prey
| First Officer
| Klingon
|-
| Brad Boimler 
| Jack Quaid
| Season 1 (LOW)
| Ensign
| USS Cerritos 
|
| Human
|-
| Boothby
| Ray Walston
| Season 5 (TNG) Season 5 (VOY)
| Civilian
| Starfleet Academy
| Groundskeeper
| Human
|-
| rowspan="3" | Borg Queen
| Alice Krige
| rowspan="3" | Seasons 5–7 (VOY) Movies (FCT)Season 2 (PIC)
| rowspan="3" | None
| rowspan="3" | Borg Collective
| rowspan="3" | Leader of Borg Collective
| rowspan="3" | Borg
|-
| Susanna Thompson
|-
| Annie Wersching
|-
| Phillip Boyce
| John Hoyt
| "The Cage"
| Lt. Commander
| USS Enterprise
| Chief Medical Officer
| Human
|-
| Brunt
| Jeffrey Combs
| Seasons 3–7 (DS9)
| Civilian
| Ferenginar resident
| Ferengi Commerce Liquidator
| Ferengi
|-
| R. A. Bryce
| Ronnie Rowe Jr.
| Seasons 1–3 (DSC)
| Lieutenant, JG
| USS Discovery
| Communications Officer
| Human
|-
| Gabrielle Burnham
| Sonja Sohn
| Seasons 2-3 (DSC)
| None
| Section 31
| Intelligence Operative Astrophysicist
| Human
|-
| Michael Burnham
| Sonequa Martin-Green
| Seasons 1–3 (DSC)
| Commander (S1-2) Crewman (S1) 
| USS Discovery (S1-2) USS Shenzhou (S1) 
| Science Officer (S2)  Science Specialist (S1) First Officer (S1)
| Human
|-
| Joseph Carey
| Josh Clark
| Seasons 1,5–7 (VOY)
| Lieutenant
| USS Voyager
| Engineering Officer
| Human
|-
| Chakotay
| Robert Beltran
| Seasons 1–7 (VOY)
| Commander (provisional)
| USS Voyager
| First Officer (S1-7) Maquis (S1)
| Human
|-
| rowspan="2" | Christine Chapel
| Majel Barrett
| Seasons 1–3 (TOS) Seasons 1–2 (TAS) Movies (TMP, TVH) 
| Commander (TMP, TVH) Crewman (TOS, TAS)
| Starfleet Command (TVH) USS Enterprise (TOS, TAS, TMP)
| Starfleet Command Officer (TVH) Medical Officer (TMP) Nurse (TOS, TAS)
| rowspan="2" | Human
|-
| Jess Bush
|Season 1 (SNW)
|Crewman (SNW)
|USS Enterprise (SNW)
|Nurse (SNW)
|-
| rowspan="2" | Pavel Chekov
| Walter Koenig
| Seasons 2–3 (TOS) Movies (TMP, WOK, SFS, TVH, TFF, TUC, GEN) Season 5 (DS9) 
| Commander (WOK, SFS, TVH, TFF, TUC, GEN) Lieutenant (TMP) 
| USS Enterprise-A (TVH, TFF, TUC) USS Reliant (WOK) USS Enterprise (TOS, TMP, SFS)
| Chief Security Officer (SFS, TVH, TFF, TUC) First Officer (WOK) Weapons Officer (TMP) Navigator (TOS)
| rowspan="2" | Human
|-
| Anton Yelchin
|ST09, STID, STB
|Ensign (ST09, STID, STB)
|USS Enterprise (ST09, STID, STB)
|Navigator (ST09, STID, STB)
|-
| J. M. Colt
| Laurel Goodwin
| "The Cage"
| Yeoman
| USS Enterprise
| Yeoman
| Human
|-
| Katrina Cornwell
| Jayne Brook
| Seasons 1-2 (DSC) 
| Vice Admiral
| Starfleet Command
| Admiral of Starfleet
| Human
|-
| rowspan="2" | Kimara Cretak
| Adrienne Barbeau
| rowspan="2" | Season 7 (DS9)
| rowspan="2" | Senator
| rowspan="2" | Deep Space 9
| rowspan="2" | Romulan Representative
| rowspan="2" | Romulan
|-
| Megan Cole
|-
| Beverly Crusher
| Gates McFadden
| Seasons 1,3–7 (TNG) Movies (GEN, FCT, INS, NEM) Season 3 (PIC)
| Commander
| USS Enterprise-E (FCT, INS, NEM) USS Enterprise-D (S1,3-7, GEN) Starfleet Command (S2)
| Chief Medical Officer (S1, 3–7, Movies) Head of Starfleet Medical (S2)
| Human
|-
| Wesley Crusher
| Wil Wheaton 
| Seasons 1–4,5,7 (TNG) Season 2 (PIC)Movies (NEM)
| Lieutenant, JG (NEM) Cadet (S4-7) Ensign (S3-4) Ensign (acting) (S1-3) Civilian (S1)
| USS Titan (NEM) Starfleet Academy (S4-7) USS Enterprise-D (S1-4)
| Engineering Officer (NEM)  Starfleet Cadet (S4-7) Helmsman (S1-4)
| Human
|-
| Hugh Culber
| Wilson Cruz
| Season 1–3 (DSC)
| Lt. Commander 
| USS Discovery
| Chief Medical Officer 
| Human/xB
|-
| Jal Culluh
| Anthony De Longis
| Seasons 1–3 (VOY)
| First Maje
| Kazon-Nistrim
| Leader of Kazon-Nistrim
| Kazon
|-
| Elizabeth Cutler
| Kellie Waymire
| Season 1 (ENT)
| Crewman
| Enterprise NX-01
| Entomologist
| Human
|-
| Leonardo da Vinci
| John Rhys-Davies
| Seasons 3–4 (VOY)
| None
| USS Voyager Program
| Holographic Character
| Hologram
|-
| Damar
| Casey Biggs
| Seasons 4–7 (DS9)
| Legate (S7) Gul (S6-7) Glinn (S4-6)
| Cardassia PrimeCMS Groumall (S4)
| Leader of Cardassian Union  (S7) Dominion Leader  (S6-7) Vigilante (S5) Cardassian Officer  (S4)
| Cardassian
|-
| Daniels
| Matt Winston
| Seasons 1–4 (ENT)
| Crewman
| Unknown
| Temporal Agent
| Human
|-
| Data
| Brent Spiner
| Seasons 1–7 (TNG) Movies (GEN, FCT, INS, NEM) Season 1 (PIC)
| Lt. Commander
| USS Enterprise-E (FCT, INS, NEM) USS Enterprise-D (S1-7, GEN)
| Chief Operations Officer (TNG, GEN, FCT, INS, NEM)
| Android
|-
| Ezri Dax
| Nicole de Boer
| Season 7 (DS9)
| Lieutenant, JG (S7) Ensign (S7)
| Deep Space 9
| Counselor
| Trill
|-
| Jadzia Dax
| Terry Farrell
| Seasons 1–6 (DS9)
| Lt. Commander (S4-6) Lieutenant (S1-3)
| Deep Space 9
| Chief Science Officer
| Trill
|-
| Degra
| Randy Oglesby
| Season 3 (ENT)
| Civilian
| Xindi Council
| Scientist
| Xindi-Primate 
|-
| Keyla Detmer
| Emily Coutts
| Seasons 1–3 (DSC)
| Lieutenant (S1-2) Lieutenant, JG (S1)
| USS Discovery (S1-2) USS Shenzhou (S1) 
| Helmsman
| Human
|-
| The Doctor
| Robert Picardo
| Seasons 1–7 (VOY)
| None
| USS Voyager
| Chief Medical Officer
| Hologram
|-
| Dolim
| Scott MacDonald
| Season 3 (ENT)
| Commander
| Xindi Council
| Council Member
| Xindi-Reptilian 
|-
| Dukat
| Marc Alaimo
| Seasons 1–7 (DS9)
| Gul
| Cardassia Prime
| Religious Leader (S6-7) Leader of Cardassia (S5) Vigilante (S4-5) Freighter Commander (S4) Cardassian Officer (S1-4) 
| Cardassian
|-
| Michael Eddington
| Kenneth Marshall
| Seasons 3–5 (DS9)
| Civilian (S4-5) Lt. Commander (S3-4)
| Deep Space 9 (S3-4)
| Maquis (S7) Security Officer (S5-7) 
| Human
|-
| Elnor
| Evan Evagora
| Seasons 1-2 (PIC)
| Cadet (S2) Qowat Milat  (S1)
| USS Excelsior (S2) Vashti resident  (S1)
| Starfleet Cadet (S2) Qalankhkai to Picard  (S1)
| Romulan
|-
| Evek
| Richard Poe
| Season 7 (TNG) Season 2 (DS9) Season 1 (VOY)
| Gul
| CMS Vetar
| Commanding Officer
| Cardassian
|-
| Female Changeling
| Salome Jens
| Seasons 3–4,6–7 (DS9)
| None
| Cardassia Prime
| Leader of Dominion
| Changeling
|-
| Vic Fontaine
| James Darren
| Seasons 6–7 (DS9)
| None
| Deep Space 9 Program
| Holographic Entertainer
| Hologram
|-
| Maxwell Forrest
| Vaughn Armstrong
| Seasons 1–4 (ENT)
| Vice Admiral
| Starfleet Command
| NX Project
| Human
|-
| Elim Garak
| Andrew Robinson
| Seasons 1–7 (DS9)
| Civilian
| Deep Space 9 resident
| Tailor
| Cardassian
|-
| Garrison
| Adam Roarke
| "The Cage"
| Chief Petty Officer
| USS Enterprise
| Communications Officer
| Human
|-
| Philippa Georgiou
| Michelle Yeoh
| Seasons 1-3 (DSC)  Season 1 (S31)
| Captain (S1)
| NCIA-93 (S2) Section 31 (S1-3) USS Shenzhou (S1)
| Intelligence Operative (S1-3)  Emperor, Mirror Universe (S1) Commanding Officer (S1)
| Human
|-
| Sonya Gomez
| Lycia Naff
| Season 2 (TNG) Season 2 (LOW)
| Ensign
| USS Enterprise-D
| Engineering Officer
| Human
|-
| Gowron
| Robert O'Reilly
| Seasons 4–6 (TNG) Seasons 3–7 (DS9)
| Chancellor
| Klingon High Council
| Chancellor of Klingon Empire
| Klingon
|-
| rowspan="3" | Amanda Grayson
| Jane Wyatt
| Season 2 (TOS) Seasons 1 (TAS) Movies (TVH, TFF) 
| rowspan="3" | Civilian
| rowspan="3" | Vulcan resident
| rowspan="3" |Teacher
| rowspan="3" | Human
|-
| Winona Ryder
|ST09
|-
| Mia Kirshner
|Season 1 (DSC)
|-
| Guinan
| Whoopi Goldberg
| Seasons 2–6 (TNG) Movies (GEN, NEM) Season 2 (PIC)
| Civilian
| USS Enterprise-D
| Bartender
| El-Aurian
|-
| J. Hayes
| Steven Culp
| Season 3 (ENT)
| Major
| Enterprise NX-01
| MACO Officer
| Human
|-
| Erika Hernandez
| Ada Maris
| Season 4 (ENT)
| Captain
| Columbia NX-02
| Commanding Officer
| Human
|-
| Hogan
| Simon Billig
| Seasons 2–3 (VOY)
| Ensign (provisional)
| USS Voyager
| Engineering Officer Maquis (previous)
| Human
|-
| Mr. Homn
| Carel Struycken
| Seasons 1–5 (TNG)
| Civilian
| Betazed resident
| Servant
| Unknown
|-
| Hugh
| Jonathan Del Arco
| Seasons 5–7 (TNG) Season 1 (PIC)
| None
| Romulan Reclamation Site
| Borg Drone (TNG) Director of Romulan Reclamation Site (PIC)
| Borg (TNG) Human/xB (PIC) 
|-
| rowspan="2" | Icheb
| Manu Intiraymi
| Seasons 6–7 (VOY) 
| Civilian (VOY) 
| USS Voyager resident (VOY) 
| Astrometrics (VOY) 
| rowspan="2" | Borg (VOY S6) Brunali/xB (VOY S6-7, PIC)
|-
| Casey King
|Season 1 (PIC)
|Lieutenant (PIC)
|USS Coleman (PIC)
|Command Officer (PIC)
|-
| rowspan="2" | Ishka
| Cecily Adams
| rowspan="2" | Seasons 3, 5–7 (DS9)
| rowspan="2" | Civilian
| rowspan="2" | Ferenginar resident
| rowspan="2" | Philanthropist
| rowspan="2" | Ferengi
|-
| Andrea Martin
|-
| Kathryn Janeway
| Kate Mulgrew
| Seasons 1–7 (VOY) Movies (NEM)
| Vice Admiral (NEM) Captain (VOY)
| Starfleet Command (NEM) USS Voyager (VOY)
| Starfleet Admiral (NEM) Commanding Officer (VOY)
| Human
|-
| Jannar
| Rick Worthy
| Season 3 (ENT)
| Civilian
| Xindi Council
| Scientist
| Xindi-Arboreal 
|-
| Michael Jonas
| Raphael Sbarge
| Season 2 (VOY)
| Crewman (provisional)
| USS Voyager
| Engineering Officer Maquis (previous)
| Human
|-
| Agnes Jurati
| Alison Pill
| Seasons 1-2 (PIC)
| Civilian
| Daystrom Institute
| Cyberneticist
| Human
|-
| K'Ehleyr
| Suzie Plakson
| Seasons 2, 4 (TNG)
| Ambassador
| Earth resident
| Federation Ambassador
| Klingon/Human
|-
| Kes
| Jennifer Lien
| Seasons 1–4, 6 (VOY)
| Civilian
| USS Voyager
| MedicAeroponics
| Ocampa
|-
| rowspan="2" |Khan Noonien Singh
|Ricardo Montalbán
| rowspan="2" |Season 1 (TOS)Movies (WOK, STID)
| rowspan="2" |Civilian
| rowspan="2" |SS Botany Bay (TOS)
| rowspan="2" |Superhuman
| rowspan="2" |Human
|-
|Benedict Cumberbatch
|-
| Harry Kim
| Garrett Wang
| Seasons 1–7 (VOY)
| Ensign
| USS Voyager
| Chief Operations Officer
| Human
|-
| Kira Nerys
| Nana Visitor
| Seasons 1–7 (DS9)
| Colonel (S7) Commander (S7) Major (S1-6)
| Deep Space 9
| Commanding Officer (S7)  First Officer (S1-7)
| Bajoran
|-
|George Kirk
|Chris Hemsworth
|ST09
|Captain
|USS Enterprise (ST09)
|Commanding Officer
|Human
|-
| rowspan="2" | James T. Kirk
| William Shatner
| rowspan="2" | Seasons 1–3 (TOS) Seasons 1–2 (TAS) Movies (TMP, WOK, SFS, TVH, TFF, TUC, GEN, ST09, STID, STB) Season 5 (DS9) 
| rowspan="2" | Captain (TOS, TAS, TFF, TUC, GEN, STID, STB) Rear Admiral (TMP, WOK, SFS, TVH) Cadet (ST09)
| rowspan="2" | USS Enterprise-A (TVH, TFF, TUC) USS Enterprise (TOS, TAS, TMP, WOK, SFS, ST09, STID, STB)
| rowspan="2" | Commanding Officer (TOS, TAS, TMP, WOK, SFS, TVH, TFF, TUC, STID, STB) First Officer (ST09)
| rowspan="2" | Human
|-
| Chris Pine
|-
| Kol
| Kenneth Mitchell
| Season 1 (DSC)
| General, Klingon Empire
| Klingon High Council
| Council Member
| Klingon
|-
| Kor
| John Colicos
| Season 1 (TOS) Season 1 (TAS) Seasons 2, 4, 7 (DS9)
| Dahar Master (DS9) Commander, Klingon Empire (TOS, TAS) 
| Klingon Defense Force (DS9) IKS Klothos (TOS, TAS)
| Defence Officer (DS9) Commanding Officer (TOS, TAS)
| Klingon
|-
| Kurn
| Tony Todd
| Seasons 3–5 (TNG) Season 4 (DS9)
| Crewman, Bajoran Militia (DS9) Captain, Klingon Empire (TNG)
| Deep Space 9 (DS9) IKS Hegh'ta (TNG)
| Security Officer (DS9) Commanding Officer (TNG)
| Klingon
|-
| Geordi La Forge
| LeVar Burton
| Seasons 1–7 (TNG) Movies (GEN, FCT, INS, NEM) Season 5 (VOY)
| Lt. Commander (S3-7, Movies) Lieutenant (S2) Lieutenant, JG (S1)
| USS Enterprise-E (FCT, INS, NEM) USS Enterprise-D (S1-7, GEN)
| Chief Engineer (S2-7, Movies) Helmsman (S1)
| Human
|-
|La'an Noonien-Singh
|Christina Chong
|Season 1 (SNW)
|Lieutenant
|USS Enterprise
|Chief Security Officer
|Human
|-
| Laris
| Orla Brady
| Seasons 1-2 (PIC)
| Civilian
| Earth resident
| Vineyard Manager
| Romulan
|-
| Leeta
| Chase Masterson
| Seasons 3–7 (DS9)
| Civilian
| Deep Space 9 resident 
| Dabo Girl
| Bajoran
|-
| Leland
| Alan van Sprang
| Season 2 (DSC)
| Captain
| NCIA-93 Section 31
| Commanding Officer Intelligence Operative
| Human
|-
| Li Nalas
| Richard Beymer
| Season 2 (DS9)
| Navarch
| Deep Space 9
| Liaison Officer
| Bajoran
|-
| Linus
| David Benjamin Tomlinson
| Seasons 2–3 (DSC)
| Lieutenant, JG
| USS Discovery
| Science Officer
| Saurian
|-
| Gabriel Lorca
| Jason Isaacs
| Season 1 (DSC)
| Captain
| USS Discovery
| Commanding Officer
| Human
|-
| Lore
| Brent Spiner
| Seasons 1, 4, 6–7 (TNG)
| Civilian
| 
| 
| Android
|-
| L'Rell
| Mary Chieffo
| Seasons 1–2 (DSC) 
| Chancellor
| Klingon High Council
| Chancellor of Klingon Empire
| Klingon
|-
| Lursa
| Barbara March
| Seasons 4–5, 7 (TNG) Movies (GEN)  Season 1 (DS9)
| Captain, Klingon Empire
| Bird of Prey
| Commanding Officer
| Klingon
|-
| Maihar'du
| Tiny Ron Taylor
| Seasons 1–3, 5–7 (DS9)
| Civilian
| Ferenginar resident
| Attendant to Grand Nagus
| Hupyrian
|-
| Mallora
| Tucker Smallwood
| Season 3 (ENT)
| Civilian
| Xindi Council
| Chairman
| Xindi-Primate
|-
| rowspan="2" | Carol Marcus
| Bibi Besch
| rowspan="2" | Movies (WOK, SFS, STID)
| rowspan="2" | Civilian (WOK, SFS) Lieutenant (STID)
| rowspan="2" | Project Genesis (WOK, SFS) USS Enterprise (STID)
| rowspan="2" | Biologist
| rowspan="2" | Human
|-
| Alice Eve
|-
| Beckett Mariner
| Tawny Newsome
| Season 1 (LOW)
| Ensign
| USS Cerritos 
|
| Human
|-
| Martok
| J. G. Hertzler
| Seasons 4–7 (DS9)
| Chancellor (S7) General, Klingon Empire (S4-7)
| Deep Space 9IKS Rotarran
| Chancellor of Klingon Empire (S7) Commander of Klingon Forces (S4-7)
| Klingon
|-
| Travis Mayweather
| Anthony Montgomery
| Seasons 1–4 (ENT)
| Ensign
| Enterprise NX-01
| Helmsman
| Human
|-
| rowspan="2" | Leonard McCoy
| DeForest Kelley
| rowspan="2" | Seasons 1–3 (TOS) Seasons 1–2 (TAS) Movies (TMP, WOK, SFS, TVH, TFF, TUC, ST09, STID, STB) Season 1 (TNG) Season 5 (DS9) 
| rowspan="2" | Admiral (TNG) Commander (TMP, WOK, SFS, TVH, TFF, TUC) Lt. Commander (TOS, TAS, ST09, STID, STB)
| rowspan="2" | USS Enterprise-A (TVH, TFF, TUC) USS Enterprise (TOS, TAS, TMP, WOK, SFS, ST09, STID, STB)
| rowspan="2" | Chief Medical Officer
| rowspan="2" | Human
|-
| Karl Urban
|-
| Mezoti
| Marley S. McClean
| Seasons 6–7 (VOY)
| Civilian
| USS Voyager Passenger
|
| Norcadian
|-
| Mila
| Julianna McCarthy
| Seasons 3,7 (DS9)
| Civilian
| Cardassia resident
| Housekeeper
| Cardassian
|-
| Mora Pol
| James Sloyan
| Seasons 2,5 (DS9)
| Civilian
| Bajor resident
| Scientist
| Bajoran
|-
| Morn
| Mark Allen Shepherd
| Seasons 1–7 (DS9) Season 1 (VOY)
| Civilian
| Deep Space 9 resident 
| Courier
| Lurian
|-
| Mot
| Ken Thorley
| Seasons 5–6 (TNG)
| Civilian
| USS Enterprise-D
| Barber
| Bolian
|-
| rowspan="2" | Harry Mudd
| Roger C. Carmel
| rowspan="2" | Seasons 1–2 (TOS) Season 1 (TAS) Season 1 (DSC)Season 1 (ST)
| rowspan="2" | Civilian
| rowspan="2" |
| rowspan="2" | Smuggler
| rowspan="2" | Human
|-
| Rainn Wilson
|-
| Raffi Musiker
| Michelle Hurd
| Seasons 1-3 (PIC)
| Commander (S2) Civilian (S1)
| Stafleet Intelligence (S3)  USS Excelsior (S2)
| Chief Operations Officer (S2)
| Human
|-
| Narek 
| Harry Treadaway
| Season 1 (PIC)
| Zhat Vash Operative
| 
| 
| Romulan
|-
| Alynna Nechayev
| Natalia Nogulich
| Seasons 6–7 (TNG) Seasons 2–3 (DS9)
| Fleet Admiral
| Starfleet Command
| Admiral of Starfleet
| Human
|-
| Neelix
| Ethan Phillips
| Seasons 1–7 (VOY)
| Ambassador (S7) Civilian (S1-7)
| Talaxian Asteroid Colony (S7) USS Voyager  (S1-7)
| Federation Ambassador (S7) Chef (S1-7)
| Talaxian
|-
| | Nhan
| Rachael Ancheril
| Seasons 2-3 (DSC)
| Commander
| USS Discovery (S2-3) USS Enterprise (S2)
| Chief Security Officer
| Barzan
|-
| Susan Nicoletti
| Christine Delgado
| Seasons 1–4,7 (VOY)
| Lieutenant, JG
| USS Voyager
| Engineering Officer
| Human
|-
| Nilsson
| Sara Mitich 
| Seasons 2-3 (DSC)
| Lieutenant
| USS Discovery
| Operations Officer
| Human
|-
| Nog
| Aron Eisenberg
| Seasons 1–7 (DS9)
| Lieutenant, JG (S7) Ensign (S6-7) Cadet (S4-5) Civilian (S1-4)
| Deep Space 9Starfleet Academy (S4-5)
| Operations Officer (S6-7) Starfleet Cadet (S4-5) Bar Employee (S1-4) Student (S1-4)
| Ferengi
|-
| Kashimuro Nozawa
| John Tampoya
| Seasons 1–4,7 (VOY)
| Ensign
| USS Voyager
| Operations Officer
| Human
|-
| Keiko O'Brien
| Rosalind Chao
| Seasons 4–6 (TNG) Seasons 1–7 (DS9)
| Civilian
| Deep Space 9 (DS9) USS Enterprise-D (TNG)
| Teacher/Botanist (DS9) Botanist (TNG)
| Human
|-
| Miles O'Brien
| Colm Meaney
| Seasons 1–7 (TNG) Seasons 1–7 (DS9)
| Chief Petty Officer
| Starfleet Academy (DS9 S7) Deep Space 9 (DS9 S1-7) USS Enterprise-D (TNG S1-6)
| Academy Professor (DS9 S7) Chief of Operations (DS9 S1-7) Transporter Chief (TNG S2-6) Helmsman (TNG S1)
| Human
|-
| Molly O'Brien
| Hana Hatae
| Seasons 1–7 (DS9)
| Civilian
| Deep Space 9 resident
| Student
| Human
|-
| Odo
| René Auberjonois
| Seasons 1–7 (DS9)
| Constable (unofficial)
| Deep Space 9
| Chief of Security
| Changeling
|-
| Alyssa Ogawa
| Patti Yasutake
| Seasons 3–7 (TNG) Movies (GEN, FCT)
| Lieutenant, JG (S7, Movies) Ensign (S3-7)
| USS Enterprise-E (FCT) USS Enterprise-D (S3-7, GEN)
| Nurse
| Human
|-
| Oh
| Tamlyn Tomita
| Season 1 (PIC)
| Commodore
| Starfleet Command
| Head of Starfleet Security
| Vulcan
|-
| Opaka Sulan
| Camille Saviola
| Seasons 1–2,4 (DS9)
| Kai
| Bajor resident
| Bajoran Religious Leader (S1)
| Bajoran
|-
| Joann Owosekun
| Oyin Oladejo
| Seasons 1–3 (DSC)
| Lieutenant, JG
| USS Discovery
| Operations Officer
| Human
|-
| Owen Paris
| Warren MunsonRichard Herd
| Seasons 2,5–7 (VOY)
| Admiral
| Starfleet Command
| Pathfinder Project
| Human
|-
| Tom Paris
| Robert Duncan McNeill
| Seasons 1–7 (VOY)
| Lieutenant, JG (S1-7) Ensign (S5-6)
| USS Voyager
| Helmsman
| Human
|-
| Phlox
| John Billingsley
| Seasons 1–4 (ENT)
| Civilian
| Enterprise NX-01
| Chief Medical Officer
| Denobulan
|-
| Jean-Luc Picard
| Patrick Stewart
| Seasons 1–7 (TNG) Movies (GEN, FCT, INS, NEM) Season 1 (DS9) Seasons 1-3 (PIC)
| Admiral (PIC) Captain (TNG, Movies)
| Earth resident (PIC) USS Enterprise-E (FCT, INS, NEM) USS Enterprise-D (TNG S1-7, GEN)
| Commanding Officer (TNG, Movies)
| Human
|-
| Renée Picard
| Penelope Mitchell
| Season 2 (PIC)
| Civilian
| Europa Mission
| NASA Astronaut
| Human
|-
| rowspan="3" | Christopher Pike
| Jeffrey Hunter
| "The Cage"  Season 1 (TOS) 
| rowspan="3" | Admiral (STID) Captain (TC, TOS, ST09, DSC)
| rowspan="3" | Starfleet Command (STID) USS Enterprise (TC, ST09, DSC)
| rowspan="3" | Starfleet Admiral (STID) Commanding Officer (TC, ST09, DSC)
| rowspan="3" | Human
|-
| Bruce Greenwood
|ST09, STID
|-
| Anson Mount
|Season 2 (DSC)Season 1 (SNW)
|-
| Tracy Pollard
| Raven Dauda
| Seasons 1–3 (DSC)
| Lieutenant, JG
| USS Discovery
| Medical Officer
| Human
|-
| Katherine Pulaski
| Diana Muldaur
| Season 2 (TNG)
| Commander
| USS Enterprise-D 
| Chief Medical Officer
| Human
|-
| Q
| John de Lancie
| Seasons 1–4, 6–7 (TNG) Season 1 (DS9) Seasons 2–3, 7 (VOY) Season 1 (LOW) Season 2 (PIC)
| None
| Q Continuum resident
| Q Continuum
| Q
|-
| Quark
| Armin Shimerman
| Season 7 (TNG) Seasons 1–7 (DS9) Season 1 (VOY)
| Civilian
| Deep Space 9 resident
| Bar Owner
| Ferengi
|-
| Janice Rand
| Grace Lee Whitney
| Season 1 (TOS) Movies (TMP, TVH, TUC) Season 3 (VOY)
| Commander (TUC) Chief Petty Officer (TVH) Crewman (TMP) Yeoman (TOS)
| USS Excelsior (TUC) Starfleet Command (TVH) USS Enterprise (TOS, TMP)
| First Officer (TUC) Starfleet Command Officer (TVH) Transporter Chief (TMP) Yeoman (TOS)
| Human
|-
| Rebi
| Cody Wetherill
| Seasons 6–7 (VOY)
| Civilian
| USS Voyager Passenger
|
| Wysanti/xB
|-
| Malcolm Reed
| Dominic Keating
| Seasons 1–4 (ENT)
| Lieutenant
| Enterprise NX-01
| Tactical Officer
| Human
|-
| Jet Reno
| Tig Notaro
| Seasons 2-3 (DSC)
| Lt. Commander
| USS Discovery (S2-3) USS Hiawatha (S2)
| Chief Engineer
| Human
|-
| Gen Rhys
| Patrick Kwok-Choon
| Seasons 1-3 (DSC)
| Lieutenant
| USS Discovery
| Tactical Officer
| Human
|-
| William Riker
| Jonathan Frakes
| Seasons 1–7 (TNG) Movies (GEN, FCT, INS, NEM) Season 2 (VOY)Season 4 (ENT)Seasons 1,3 (PIC)Season 1 (LOW)
| Captain (NEM, PIC, LOW) Commander <small>(TNG S1-7, Movies)</small>
| USS Zheng He (PIC S1)USS Titan (NEM, LOW S1)USS Enterprise-E (FCT, INS, NEM)USS Enterprise-D (TNG S1-7, GEN)
| Commanding Officer (NEM, PIC S1, LOW S1) First Officer (TNG S1-7, Movies)
| Human
|-
| Cristóbal "Chris" Rios 
| Santiago Cabrera
| Seasons 1-2 (PIC)
| Captain (S2) Civilian (S1) 
| USS Stargazer (S2)  La Sirena (S1) 
| Commanding Officer (S2) Civilian Starship Captain (S1)
| Human
|-
| Narissa Rizzo
| Peyton List
| Season 1 (PIC)
| Zhat Vash Operative
| 
| 
| Romulan
|-
| Ro Laren
| Michelle Forbes
| Seasons 5–7 (TNG)
| Lieutenant (S7) Ensign (S5-6)
| USS Enterprise-D
| Maquis (S7) Helmsman (S5-7) 
| Bajoran
|-
| Rom
| Max Grodénchik
| Seasons 1–7 (DS9)
| Grand Nagus (S7) Crewman (S4-7) Civilian (S1-4)
| Deep Space 9
| Grand Nagus (S7) Maintenance Engineer (S4-7) Bar Employee (1–4)
| Ferengi
|-
| William Ross
| Barry Jenner
| Seasons 6–7 (DS9)
| Vice Admiral
| Deep Space 9
| Military Commander
| Human
|-
| Michael Rostov
| Joseph Will
| Seasons 1–2 (ENT)
| Crewman
| Enterprise NX-01
| Engineering Officer
| Human
|-
| rowspan="2" | Alexander Rozhenko
| Jon Paul Steuer
| rowspan="2" | Seasons 4–7 (TNG) Season 6 (DS9)
| rowspan="2" | Crewman, Klingon Empire (DS9) Civilian (TNG)
| rowspan="2" | IKS Rotarran (DS9)
| rowspan="2" | Weapons Officer (DS9)
| rowspan="2" | Klingon/Human
|-
| Brian Bonsall
|-
| rowspan="2" | Saavik
| Kirstie Alley
| rowspan="2" | Movies (WOK, SFS, TVH)
| rowspan="2" | Lieutenant, JG
| rowspan="2" | USS Grissom (SFS, TVH) USS Enterprise (WOK)
| rowspan="2" | Science Officer (SFS, TVH) Navigator (WOK)
| rowspan="2" | Vulcan/Romulan
|-
| Robin Curtis
|-
| rowspan="3" | Sarek
| Mark Lenard
| rowspan="3" | Season 2 (TOS) Seasons 1 (TAS) Movies (TMP, SFS, TVH, TUC, ST09) Seasons 3, 5 (TNG) Seasons 1–2 (DSC)
| rowspan="3" | Ambassador
| rowspan="3" | Vulcan resident
| rowspan="3" | Federation Ambassador
| rowspan="3" | Vulcan
|-
| Ben Cross
|-
| James Frain
|-
| Saru
| Doug Jones
| Seasons 1–3 (DSC)Season 1 (ST)
| Commander
| USS Discovery (S1-3) USS Shenzhou (S1)
| First Officer (S1-2)  Science Officer (S1)
| Kelpien
|-
| Hoshi Sato
| Linda Park
| Seasons 1–4 (ENT)
| Ensign
| Enterprise NX-01
| Communications Officer
| Human
|-
| Sela
| Denise Crosby
| Seasons 4–5 (TNG)
| Commander, Romulan Empire
| Unknown
| Romulan Officer
| Romulan/Human
|-
| Seska
| Martha Hackett
| Seasons 1–3,7 (VOY)
| None (S1-3) Ensign (provisional) (S1)
| Kazon-Nistrim (S1-3) USS Voyager (S1)
| Kazon Affiliate (S1-3)  Engineering Officer (S1) Science Officer (S1)  Maquis Infiltrator (previous)
| Cardassian
|-
| Seven of Nine
| Jeri Ryan
| Seasons 4–7 (VOY) Seasons 1-3 (PIC)
| Civilian
| La Sirena (PIC S2) USS Voyager (VOY)
| Vigilante (PIC) Astrometrics (VOY)
| Human/xB
|-
| rowspan="2" | Montgomery Scott
| James Doohan
| rowspan="2" | Seasons 1–3 (TOS) Seasons 1–2 (TAS) Movies (TMP, WOK, SFS, TVH, TFF, TUC, GEN, ST09, STID, STB) Season 6 (TNG) Season 5 (DS9) 
| rowspan="2" | Captain (SFS, TVH, TFF, TUC, GEN, TNG) Commander (TMP, WOK) Lt. Commander (TOS, TAS, ST09, STID, STB)
| rowspan="2" | USS Enterprise-A (TVH, TFF, TUC) USS Enterprise (TOS, TAS, TMP, WOK, SFS, ST09, STID, STB)
| rowspan="2" | Chief Engineer
| rowspan="2" | Human
|-
| Simon Pegg
|-
| Shakaar Edon
| Duncan Regehr
| Seasons 3–5 (DS9)
| First Minister
| Bajor resident
| First Minister of Bajor
| Bajoran
|-
| Thy'lek Shran
| Jeffrey Combs
| Seasons 1–4 (ENT)
| General
| Kumari| Andorian Imperial Guard
| Andorian
|-
| Silik
| John Fleck
| Seasons 1–4 (ENT)
| Senior Official
| Suliban Cabal
| Terrorist
| Suliban 
|-
| Benjamin Sisko
| Avery Brooks
| Seasons 1–7 (DS9)
| Captain (S3-7) Commander (S1-3)
| Deep Space 9
| Commanding Officer
| Human
|-
| Jake Sisko
| Cirroc Lofton
| Seasons 1–7 (DS9)
| Civilian
| Deep Space 9 resident
| Journalist (S5-7) Student (S1-5)
| Human
|-
| Jennifer Sisko
| Felecia M. Bell
| Seasons 1,3–4 (DS9)
| Lieutenant (S1)
| USS Saratoga (S1)
| Starfleet Officer (S1)
| Human
|-
| Joseph Sisko
| Brock Peters
| Seasons 4,6–7 (DS9)
| Civilian
| Earth resident
| Restaurant Owner
| Human
|-
| Sarah Sisko
| Deborah Lacey
| Season 7 (DS9)
| Civilian
| Earth resident
| Holophotographer
| Human
|-
| Luther Sloan
| William Sadler
| Seasons 6–7 (DS9)
| None
| Section 31
| Intelligence Operative
| Human
|-
| Soval
| Gary Graham
| Seasons 1–4 (ENT)
| Ambassador
| Earth
| Vulcan Ambassador to Earth
| Vulcan 
|-
| rowspan="3" | Spock
| Leonard Nimoy
| rowspan="3" | "The Cage" Seasons 1–3 (TOS) Seasons 1–2 (TAS) Movies (TMP, WOK, SFS, TVH, TFF, TUC, ST09, STID, STB) Season 5 (TNG) Season 5 (DS9) Season 2 (DSC) Season 1 (SNW)
| rowspan="3" | Ambassador (TNG, ST09, STID) Captain (WOK, SFS, TVH) Commander (TC, TOS, TAS, TMP, ST09, STID, STB, DSC)
| rowspan="3" | New Vulcan resident (STID) USS Enterprise-A (TVH, TFF, TUC) USS Enterprise (TC, TOS, TAS, TMP, ST09, STID, STB, DSC) Instructor (ST09)
| rowspan="3" | Federation Ambassador (TNG, ST09, STID) First Officer (TC, TOS, TAS, Movies) Science Officer (TC, TOS, TAS, ST09, STID, STB, DSC) 
| rowspan="3" | Vulcan/Human
|-
| Zachary Quinto
|-
| Ethan Peck
|-
| Paul Stamets
| Anthony Rapp
| Season 1-3 (DSC)
| Lt. Commander (S2) Lieutenant (S1)
| USS Discovery
| Science Officer
| Human
|-
| Lon Suder
| Brad Dourif
| Seasons 2–3 (VOY)
| Crewman (provisional)
| USS Voyager
| Engineering Officer Maquis (previous)
| Betazoid
|-
| rowspan="2" | Hikaru Sulu
| George Takei
| rowspan="2" | Seasons 1–3 (TOS) Seasons 1–2 (TAS) Movies (TMP, WOK, SFS, TVH, TFF, TUC, ST09, STID, STB) Season 3 (VOY)
| rowspan="2" | Captain (TUC) Commander (WOK, SFS, TVH, TFF) Lt. Commander (TMP) Lieutenant (TOS, TAS, ST09, STID, STB)
| rowspan="2" | USS Excelsior (TUC) USS Enterprise-A (TVH, TFF, TUC) USS Enterprise (TOS, TAS, TMP, WOK, SFS, ST09, STID, STB)
| rowspan="2" | Commanding Officer (TUC)  Helmsman (TOS, TAS, TMP, WOK, SFS, TVH, TFF, ST09, STID, STB)
| rowspan="2" | Human
|-
| John Cho
|-
| Enabran Tain
| Paul Dooley
| Seasons 2–3,5 (DS9)
| None
| Cardassia resident
| Leader of Obsidian Order
| Cardassian
|-
| Sylvia Tilly
| Mary Wiseman
| Season 1–3 (DSC)Season 1 (ST)
| Ensign (S2)  Cadet (S1)
| USS Discovery
| Engineering Officer (S2)  Starfleet Cadet (S1)
| Human
|-
| Tomalak
| Andreas Katsulas
| Seasons 3–4,7 (TNG)
| Commander, Romulan Empire
| IRW Terix| Commanding Officer
| Romulan
|-
| rowspan="2" | Tora Ziyal
| Melanie Smith
| rowspan="2" | Seasons 4–6 (DS9)
| rowspan="2" | Civilian
| rowspan="2" | Deep Space 9 resident
| rowspan="2" | Artist
| rowspan="2" | Bajoran/Cardassian
|-
| Cyia Batten
|-
| B'Elanna Torres
| Roxann Dawson
| Seasons 1–7 (VOY)
| Lieutenant, JG (provisional)
| USS Voyager
| Chief Engineer (S1-7) Maquis (S1)
| Klingon/Human
|-
| T'Pol
| Jolene Blalock
| Seasons 1–4 (ENT)
| Commander (S4) SubCommander (S1-4)
| Enterprise NX-01
| First Officer Science Officer
| Vulcan
|-
| The Traveler
| Eric Menyuk
| Seasons 1,4,7 (TNG)
| Civilian
| Tau Alpha C resident
|
| Unknown
|-
| Deanna Troi
| Marina Sirtis
| Seasons 1–7 (TNG) Movies (GEN, FCT, INS, NEM) Seasons 6–7 (VOY) Season 4 (ENT) Seasons 1,3 (PIC)Season 1 (LOW)
| Commander (TNG S7, VOY, Movies) Lt. Commander (TNG S1-7)
| USS Titan (NEM)  USS Enterprise-E (FCT, INS, NEM) USS Enterprise-D (TNG S1-7, GEN)
| Diplomatic Officer (NEM) Counselor (TNG S1-7, Movies)
| Betazoid/Human
|-
| Lwaxana Troi
| Majel Barrett
| Seasons 1–5,7 (TNG) Seasons 1,3–4 (DS9)
| Ambassador
| Betazed resident
| Federation Ambassador
| Betazoid
|-
| Trip Tucker
| Connor Trinneer
| Seasons 1–4 (ENT)
| Commander
| Enterprise NX-01
| Chief Engineer
| Human
|-
| Tuvok
| Tim Russ
| Seasons 1–7 (VOY)
| Lt. Commander (S4-7) Lieutenant (S1-4)
| USS Voyager
| Chief of Security
| Vulcan
|-
| Ash Tyler/Voq
| Shazad Latif
| Seasons 1–2 (DSC)
| Lieutenant (S1)
| USS Discovery
| Chief Security Officer (S1)
| Human/Klingon

|-
| José Tyler
| Peter Duryea
| "The Cage"
| Lieutenant
| USS Enterprise
| Helmsman
| Human
|-
| rowspan="3" | Nyota Uhura
| Nichelle Nichols
| Seasons 1–3 (TOS) Seasons 1–2 (TAS) Movies (TMP, WOK, SFS, TVH, TFF, TUC) Season 5 (DS9) 
| rowspan="3" | Commander (WOK, SFS, TVH, TFF, TUC) Lt. Commander (TMP) Lieutenant (TOS, TAS, ST09, STID, STB)
| rowspan="3" | USS Enterprise-A (TVH, TFF, TUC) USS Enterprise (TOS, TAS, TMP, WOK, SFS, ST09, STID, STB)
| rowspan="3" | Communications Officer
| rowspan="3" | Human
|-
| Zoe Saldana
|ST09, STID, STB
|-
|Celia Rose Gooding
|SNW Season 1
|-
| rowspan=2| Una ('Number One')
| Majel Barrett
| rowspan=2| "The Cage" Season 2 (DSC)  Season 1 (SNW)
| rowspan=2| Lt. Commander
| rowspan=2| USS Enterprise
| rowspan=2| First Officer
| rowspan=2| Human
|-
| Rebecca Romijn
|-
| Vash
| Jennifer Hetrick
| Seasons 3–4 (TNG) Season 1 (DS9)
| Civilian
| Earth resident
| Archeologist
| Human
|-
| Vorik
| Alexander Enberg
| Seasons 3–5, 7 (VOY)
| Ensign
| USS Voyager
| Engineering Officer
| Vulcan
|-
| Weyoun
| Jeffrey Combs
| Seasons 4–7 (DS9)
| None 
| Cardassia Prime
| Dominion Leader
| Vorta
|-
| Naomi Wildman
| Scarlett Pomers
| Seasons 2–7 (VOY)
| Civilian
| USS Voyager resident
| Captain's Assistant (unofficial)
| Ktarian/Human
|-
| Samantha Wildman
| Nancy Hower
| Seasons 2–6 (VOY)
| Ensign
| USS Voyager
| Science Officer
| Human
|-
| Winn Adami
| Louise Fletcher
| Seasons 1–3, 5–7 (DS9)
| Kai (S3-7) Vedek (S1-2)
| Bajor resident
| Bajoran Religious Leader
| Bajoran
|-
| Worf
| Michael Dorn
| Seasons 1–7 (TNG) Movies (GEN, FCT, INS, NEM) Seasons 4–7 (DS9) Season 3 (PIC)
| Lt. Commander (DS9, Movies) Ambassador (DS9 S7) Lieutenant (TNG S3-7) Lieutenant, JG (TNG S1-2)
| USS Enterprise-E (NEM) Qo'noS (DS9 S7) Deep Space 9 (DS9 S4-7) USS Enterprise-D (S1-7,GEN)
| Strategic Operations Officer (DS9 S4-7, Movies) Ambassador (DS9 S7) Chief Security Officer (TNG S2-7) Helmsman (TNG S1)
| Klingon
|-
| Tasha Yar
| Denise Crosby
| Seasons 1,3,7 (TNG)
| Lieutenant
| USS Enterprise-D 
| Chief Security Officer
| Human
|-
| Kasidy Yates
| Penny Johnson Jerald
| Seasons 3–7 (DS9)
| Captain
| SS XhosaDeep Space 9 resident
| Freighter Captain
| Human
|-
| Zek
| Wallace Shawn
| Seasons 1–3,5–7 (DS9)
| Grand Nagus
| Ferenginar resident
| Leader of Ferengi Economics
| Ferengi
|-
| Zhaban
| Jamie McShane
| Season 1 (PIC)
| Civilian
| Earth resident
| Butler
| Romulan
|}

 Appearances 
 Star Trek: The Original Series 

 Star Trek: The Next Generation 

 Star Trek: Deep Space Nine 

 Star Trek: Voyager 

 Star Trek: Enterprise 

 Star Trek: Discovery 

 Star Trek: Picard 

 Star Trek: Lower Decks 

 Star Trek: Prodigy 

  = Main cast (Credited main cast member) 
  = Recurring cast (3+ appearances in a season)

 Star Trek: Strange New Worlds 

  = Main cast (Credited main cast member) 
  = Recurring cast (3+ appearances in a season)

 Shared castStar Trek'' has an ongoing tradition of actors returning to reprise their roles in other spin-off series. In some instances, actors have portrayed potential ancestors, descendants, or relatives of characters they originated. Characters have also been recast for later appearances.

Click show below to view an incomplete list:

See also 

 List of Star Trek episodes

Notes

References